Nizam or Nezam is both a given name and a surname. It is derived from the Arabic word نِظَام niẓām, meaning "order, system", often by way of Persian. Notable people with the name include:

Given name
 Nizam Bai (1643–1692), Mughal princess consort
 Khwaja Nizam ad Din, Pakistani Sufi
 Nezam Hafiz (1969–2001), Guyanese-born American cricketer
 Hairul Nizam Hanif (born 1979), Malaysian footballer
 Sikandar Lodi (died 1517), born Nizam Kahn, Sultan of Delhi
 Saiful Nizam Miswan (born 1981), Malaysian footballer
 Ahmad ibn Nizam al-Mulk (died 1149 or 1150), Persian vizier
 Nizam al-Mulk (1018–1092), Persian scholar and vizier
 Tuan Nizam Muthaliff (1966–2005), Sri Lankan military intelligence officer
 Nizam al-Din Nishapuri (died 1328 or 1329), Persian mathematician and poet
 Nazim Pasha (1848–1913), Chief of Staff of the Army of the Ottoman Empire
 Nizam Peerwani, American medical examiner
 Burhan Nizam Shah I (c. 1503 – 1553), ruler of the Ahmednagar Sultanate
 Burhan Nizam Shah II (died 1595), ruler of the Ahmednagar Sultanate
 Hussain Nizam Shah I (born 1555; unknown death date),  ruler of the Ahmednagar Sultanate
 Murtaza Nizam Shah III, Sultan of Ahmadnagar
 Nizam al-Din Yahya (c. 1417 – 1480), the Mihrabanid malik of Sistan

Surname
 Ahmed Nizam (born 1986), Indian cricketer
 Khairul Nizam (born 1991), Singaporean footballer
 Mohamed Nizam (born 1974), Maldivian footballer
 Musa Nizam (born 1990), Turkish footballer
 Naem Nizam, Bangladeshi newspaper editor
 Sarwar Jahan Nizam (born 1952), Chief of Staff of the Bangladesh Navy
 Sheen Kaaf Nizam (born 1947), Urdu poet
 Zaiful Nizam (born 1987), Singaporean footballer